John Gray Bell (21 September 1823 – 21 February 1866) was an English bookseller.

He was the son of Thomas Bell (1785–1860), a house agent and surveyor of Newcastle-upon-Tyne. He was born at Newcastle, and married, in 1847, Dorothy Taylor of North Shields. In 1848 he went to London, and began business as a bookseller. He removed to Manchester in 1854, where he successfully followed his trade for the rest of his life. He died there 21 February 1866, aged 43.

Bell was an earnest student of antiquarian literature, collected topographical books and prints, and issued many interesting trade catalogues. In 1850 he started publishing a valuable series of Tracts on the Topography, History. Dialects, &c., of the Counties of Great Britain, of which about sixteen came out, including original glossaries of Essex, Gloucestershire, Dorset, Cumberland, and Berkshire. In 1851 he published A Descriptive and Critical Catalogue of Works, illustrated by Thomas and John Bell. This was compiled by himself. Another of his works was a genealogy of the Bell and other families, printed for private circulation in 1866, and entitled A Genealogical Account of the Descendants of John of Gaunt, Duke of Lancaster.

References

Attribution 

English booksellers
1823 births
1866 deaths
People from Newcastle upon Tyne
19th-century English businesspeople